Kim Bauermeister (born 20 November 1970, in Stuttgart) is a retired German runner who specialized in the 3000 metres steeplechase.

He won the bronze medal at the 1989 European Junior Championships and the gold medal in 3000 metres at the 1994 European Indoor Championships. He competed at the World Championships in 1993 and 1995 as well as the 1996 Summer Olympics without reaching the finals.

His personal best time is 8:23.19 minutes, achieved in August 1994 in Berlin.

He won one national silver medal in steeplechase, in 1994.

References

1970 births
Living people
German male long-distance runners
German male steeplechase runners
Athletes (track and field) at the 1996 Summer Olympics
Olympic athletes of Germany
Sportspeople from Stuttgart
20th-century German people
21st-century German people